Elise Sørensen (Kalundborg, July 2, 1903 – Ordrup, July 5, 1977) was a Danish nurse and the inventor of the colostomy bag.

In 1954 her sister had an ostomy operation (a procedure that takes the end of the intestine out through the abdomen, allowing waste to exit via a surgically created stoma). After the operation, Sørensen's sister was uncomfortable going outside due to fear that stoma might leak, due to the metal/glass capsules or fabric/rubber bags that people used at the time. 

Sørensen then created the world's first disposable ostomy bag attachable through an adhesive ring, very similar to the devices used today.

References 

1903 births
1977 deaths
Danish nurses
Medical equipment